Line 22 (Pinggu line) of the Beijing Subway is a rapid transit line under construction in Beijing and Hebei Province.

It will run from Dongdaqiao station in Chaoyang District to Pinggu station in Pinggu District with 21 stations. The line will use 8-car Type D rolling stock and will open in 2025.

Stations

History
The line was originally planned to begin at Dongfengbeiqiao station and will end at Juhewan station in Pinggu District.

However, in 2019, it was announced that the line will run in a different route. The line will still start in the urban center of Pinggu District. However when reaching Yanjiao the line will instead head south through Tongzhou District and run under Chaoyang Road between Line 6 and the Batong Line towards Beijing central business district (Beijing CBD). The original plan to terminate the line at Dongfengbeiqiao station is now reserved as long-term planning. This was done to serve more populated areas of the city and enhance integration between Beijing's city center and its new sub-center in Tongzhou District.

References

Beijing Subway lines
Proposed public transport in China
Proposed buildings and structures in Beijing
Transport infrastructure under construction in China